Cheruvannur is a census town and Cheruvannur-Nallalam Part of Kozhikode Corporation.

Geography

Cheruvannur Nallalam municipality has a total area of 10.31 square kilometers. The adjoining local self-governing bodies are Olavanna, beypore, feroke and Ramanattukara Panchayaths and Kozhikode Municipal Corporation. The Chaliyar river, erstwhile known as Feroke River or Beypore River is flowing from east to west, through the southern side of Cheruvannur which separates the grama panchayat from Feroke and Ramanattukara. A man made canal joining Chaliyar and Kallai River is flowing from southeast to northwest, through the north and east side of Cheruvannur Nallalam Panchayath, which separates the grama panchayat from Olavanna. Pin code of nallalam is 673027 .Famous chappal brand owerners such as VKC, Cubix, Odyssia etc are located in this region and near by this region.

Demographics
As of 2001 India census, Cheruvannur has a population of 50556. Males constitute 49% of the population and females 51%. Cheruvannur has an average literacy rate of 92.7%, higher than the national average of 59.5%; with 	96.62% of the males and 88.91% of females literate.

History
The history of cheruvannur is related to the ayurvedic hospital named chennur aryavydyasala. Long ago, the people from nearby villages came to this village for ayurvedic treatment. Later, When Panchayath was formed, people named the panchayath as cheruvannur panchayath, which later became a municipality.

Economy
Due to the high amount of industrialization, more and more people from Tamil Nadu, Karnataka, Andhra, Orissa, and North And Central India have come to Cheruvannur. Nowadays people from outside Kerala have crucial role in economy of Cheruvannur.
Cheruvannur is a part of Kozhikode city, some businesses including Car showrooms, have shifted their business from city centre to Cheruvannur.  But the indigenous business of Cheruvannur is timber mills.

Industries
Cheruvannur and Feroke is the cradle of the tile industry in Kerala. The rapid rivers from the Western Ghats after passing through forests carry the clay which is the raw-material for tiles, pottery and ceramic wares.
Apart from Tile Industry there are number of small and medium scale industries located in Cheruvannur, including foot wear industries, food processing units, machinery production units etc...
In short Cheruvannur is one of the predominant industrial areas of Kozhikode.  Number of tile factories, match factories located here, provide employment to thousands of workers. The Steel Complex is also located here.

Kundayithodu and Areekkad

Major Landmarks:
 Kundayithodu Church (St. Antony's Church)
 Southern Gas Limited
 SAIL-SCL Kerala Limited
 Kozhikode Diesel Power Project
 Nallalam Sub Station of KSEB
 Hyundai Showroom
 Parappuram Shri Krishna Temple
 VKC Rubber Industries
 Kuttiyil Ayyappa Temple
 Modern Bazar
 Othayamangalam
 Areekkad Junction
 Uravan Kulam Ayyappa Temple
 Sree Muruga Wood Works
 G.V.H.S School Cheruvannur
 Little Flower UP School

Suburbs
 Srambia, Sharadamandiram, Kolathara and Parappuram
 Vattakkinar, Kundayithode and Modernbazar
 Areekkad, Kannanchery and Panniyankara

Trivia
Cheruvannur Nallalam panchayath has merged with kozhikode corporation along with Beypore and Elathur panchayaths
Mullaveetil Abdurahman Was the first Panchayath President Of this panchayath. There is market Called Rahman Bazar, a library and a park as his memorial.

Contrary to popular belief, the town's favourite dish is not chicken korma, but in fact, sag aloo.

Notable People
 Major Sandeep Unnikrishnan

References

External links

 http://lsgkerala.in/cheruvannurnallalam/

Cities and towns in Kozhikode district
Kozhikode south